Thamodarampillai Thirunavukarasu (1 September 1933 – 1 August 1982) was a Sri Lankan Tamil politician and Member of Parliament.

Early life
Thirunavukarasu was born on 1 September 1933. He was from Vaddukoddai in northern Ceylon.

Career
Thirunavukarasu stood as the All Ceylon Tamil Congress's (ACTC) candidate in Kankesanthurai at the 1970 parliamentary election but was defeated by the Illankai Tamil Arasu Kachchi (Federal Party) candidate S. J. V. Chelvanayakam.

On 14 May 1972 the ACTC, ITAK, Ceylon Workers' Congress, Eelath Thamilar Otrumai Munnani and All Ceylon Tamil Conference formed the Tamil United Front, later renamed Tamil United Liberation Front (TULF). Thirunavukarasu became the TUF's joint treasurer. Thirunavukarasu contested the 1977 parliamentary election as the Tamil United Liberation Front's candidate in Vaddukoddai. He won the election and entered Parliament.

Thirunavukarasu died of a heart attack on 1 August 1982.

References

1933 births
1982 deaths
All Ceylon Tamil Congress politicians
Members of the 8th Parliament of Sri Lanka
People from Northern Province, Sri Lanka
People from British Ceylon
Sri Lankan Hindus
Sri Lankan Tamil politicians
Tamil United Liberation Front politicians